The 2024 Indian general election in Kerala will be held in or before May 2024 to elect the 40 members of 18th Lok Sabha.

Parties and alliances
Left Democratic Front, the rulling alliance of Kerala led by CPI(M) and United Democratic Front led by INC are the major contenders for Lok Sabha elections in Kerala.







References

Noes

Kerala
Indian general elections in Kerala